Wschód jest pełen słońca is the sixth album by Polish punk rock band Karcer.

Track listing
Robotnicy nocnej zmiany (en. Night shift workers)
Młodość walcząca (en. Fighting youth)
Gest idoli (en. Idols' gesture)
Wschód jest pełen słońca (en. East is full of sunshine)
Nowe lepsze czasy (en. Better new days)
Wychodzę na ulicę (en. I'm going into the street)
Czas kurtyzan (en. Prostitutes' time)
2000 lat (en. 2000 years)
Mitomania (en. Mythomania)
Roztrzelane krzesła (en. Shot down chairs)
Szeregowiec (en. Private)
Życie za hymn (en. Life for the anthem)
Ostatnie słowo (en. The last word)

Bonus CD tracks
Perfekcyjni (en. The perfects)
Chuj (en. Dick)

Personnel
Krzysztof Żeromski - guitar, vocals
Przemysław Brosz - guitar
Adam Lao - bass guitar
Tomasz Fangrat - drums

References
Band's official site
Jimmy Jazz Records

1997 albums
Karcer albums